Brickellia hastata is a North American species of shrubs in the family Asteraceae. It is found only in the state of Baja California Sur in western Mexico.

References

External links

hastata
Flora of Baja California Sur
Plants described in 1844